The South Carolina House of Representatives is the lower house of the South Carolina General Assembly.  It consists of 124 representatives elected to two-year terms at the same time as U.S. congressional elections.

Unlike many legislatures, seating on the floor is not divided by party, but is arranged by county delegation – a legacy of the original apportionment of the chamber.  Until 1964, each of South Carolina's counties was a legislative district, with the number of representatives determined by the county's population. It meets from the second week of January into May.

History
In Colonial times, there was a Commons House of Assembly.

Qualifications and terms

Representatives are considered part-time citizen legislators who serve two-year terms. Representatives are elected at-large by their district, and there are no term limits. Representatives must be 21 years of age before they are eligible to become a representative.

Composition

Leadership

Current members

Standing Committees

Party composition over time

(a) 21 were members of the Union Reform Party of South Carolina and the other 3 were Independents from Anderson. Two of the Union Reform members from Chesterfield were later replaced by Republicans from a resolution passed in the House.
(b) All 33 were members of the Conservative Party of South Carolina.
(c) All 17 were Independent Democrats.

Notes

References

Additional sources

External links
South Carolina House of Representatives
2007 seating chart
Project Vote Smart – State House of South Carolina links to each Representative

South Carolina General Assembly
State lower houses in the United States